Associate professor is an academic title with two principal meanings: in the North American system and that of the  Commonwealth system.

Overview
In the North American system, used in the United States and many other countries, it is a position between assistant professor and a full professorship. In this system an associate professorship is typically the first promotion obtained after gaining a faculty position, and in the United States it is usually connected to tenure.

In the Commonwealth system (Canada included), the title associate professor is traditionally used in place of reader in certain countries. Like the reader title it ranks above senior lecturer – which corresponds to associate professor in the North American system – and is broadly equivalent to a North American full professor, as the full professor title is held by far fewer people in the Commonwealth system. In this system an associate professorship is typically the second or third promotion obtained after gaining an academic position, and someone promoted to associate professor has usually been a permanent employee already in their two previous ranks as lecturer and senior lecturer. Traditionally British universities have used the title reader, while associate professor in place of reader is traditionally used in Australia and New Zealand, South Africa, India, Malaysia, and Ireland within an otherwise British system of ranks. More recently, the universities of Cambridge and Oxford have adopted the North American system of ranks.

Comparison

The table presents a broad overview of the traditional main systems, but there are universities which use a combination of those systems or other titles. Some universities in Commonwealth countries have also entirely adopted the North American system in place of the Commonwealth system.

References

Academic ranks